Kıvanç is a Turkish given name for (mostly) males and a surname; it means 'pleasure, pride'.
 
People named Kıvanç include:

Given name (male) 
 Kemal Kıvanç Elgaz (born 1986), Turkish volleyball player
 Kıvanç Haznedaroğlu (born 1981), Turkish chess grandmaster
 Kıvanç Tatlıtuğ (born 1983), Turkish actor and model

Surname 
 Halit Kıvanç (born 1925), Turkish television and radio presenter, humorist, sports journalist and writer

References

Turkish masculine given names
Turkish-language surnames

de:Kıvanç